Diodato Gentile, O.P. (1555–1616) was a Roman Catholic prelate who served as Bishop of Caserta (1604–1616) and Apostolic Nuncio to Naples (1611–1616).

Biography
Diodato Gentile was born in Genoa, Italy 1555 and ordained a priest in the Order of Preachers.
On 9 July 1604, he was appointed during the papacy of Pope Clement VIII as Bishop of Caserta.
On 1 August 1604, he was consecrated bishop by Domenico Pinelli, Cardinal-Bishop of Frascati, with Giuseppe Ferrerio, Archbishop of Urbino, and Agostino Quinzio, Bishop of Korčula, serving as co-consecrators.
On 6 March 1611, he was appointed during the papacy of Pope Paul V as Apostolic Nuncio to Naples.
He served as Bishop of Caserta and Apostolic Nuncio to Naples until his death in April 1616.

While bishop, he was the principal co-consecrator of Martius Andreucci, Bishop of Trogir (1604); and Giorgio Lazzari, Bishop of Minori (1604).

References

External links and additional sources
 (for Chronology of Bishops) 
 (for Chronology of Bishops) 
 (for Chronology of Bishops) 

17th-century Italian Roman Catholic bishops
Bishops appointed by Pope Clement VIII
Bishops appointed by Pope Paul V
1555 births
1616 deaths
Dominican bishops
Apostolic Nuncios to the Kingdom of Naples